Guillermo Alfonso Maripán Loaysa (born 6 May 1994) is a Chilean footballer who plays as central defender for Ligue 1 club Monaco and the Chile national team.

Club career

Universidad Católica
Maripán made his debut for Universidad Católica playing the last 15 minutes against Audax Italiano in Estadio Bicentenario in 2013. Later, he played again against Audax Italiano, but this time in the Chilean Cup, playing the entire match. That same year Maripán entered for the first time in the UC starting eleven in the Chilean Primera División, this time against Cobresal.

Alavés
On 7 July 2017, Maripán moved abroad for the first time in his career after agreeing to a four-year deal with La Liga side Deportivo Alavés.

Monaco
On 24 August 2019, Maripán joined Ligue 1 club Monaco on a five-year deal. His second season in the Monegasque team consolidated him as one of the best defenders in Ligue 1: he was designated by the CIES Football Observatory as the best Chilean of the season, and he was also the central defender who scored the most goals. Guillermo Maripán signed his best scoring season in the 2020–21 academic year, and also improved five key aspects in his game that evidenced his sporting growth.

International career
Maripán was called up to the Chile for the 2017 China Cup in China.
Maripan was called up again to the Chile for the 2018 FIFA World Cup Qualifiers against Brazil and Ecuador. Guillermo Maripán faced the Copa América 2021. He starred in one of the tournament's plays after making a feint to Lionel Messi.

Career statistics

International
As of match played 21 June 2021. Scores and results list Chile's goal tally first.

Honours
Monaco

 Coupe de France runner-up: 2020–21
Universidad Católica
Campeonato Nacional: Torneo Clausura 2015–16, Torneo Apertura 2016–17
Supercopa de Chile: 2016
Chile
China Cup: 2017

References

External links
Profile at the AS Monaco FC website

1994 births
Living people
Footballers from Santiago
Chilean people of Mapuche descent
Chilean footballers
Chilean expatriate footballers
Chile international footballers
Club Deportivo Universidad Católica footballers
Deportivo Alavés players
AS Monaco FC players
Chilean Primera División players
La Liga players
Ligue 1 players
Chilean expatriate sportspeople in Spain
Chilean expatriate sportspeople in Monaco
Chilean expatriate sportspeople in France
Expatriate footballers in Spain
Expatriate footballers in Monaco
Expatriate footballers in France
2019 Copa América players
2021 Copa América players
Association football defenders
Mapuche sportspeople
21st-century Mapuche people
20th-century Mapuche people
Indigenous sportspeople of the Americas